{
  "type": "ExternalData",
  "service": "geoline",
  "ids": "Q671428",
  "properties": {
    "title": "Landwehr Canal",
    "stroke": "#3b78cb"
  }
}

The Landwehr Canal, is a  canal parallel to the Spree river in Berlin, Germany, built between 1845 and 1850 to plans by Peter Joseph Lenné. It connects the upper part of the Spree at the eastern harbour in Friedrichshain with its lower part in Charlottenburg, flowing through Kreuzberg and Tiergarten.

History 
Today the waterway is mainly used by tourist boats and pleasure craft.

About 
The Landwehr Canal leaves the Spree River in the eastern harbour in Friedrichshain, east of the city centre. It immediately descends through the upper lock and heads in a straight line south west to its junction with the Neukölln Ship Canal, which provides a connection to the Teltow Canal. Here the Landwehr Canal turns north west through Kreuzberg, along the Paul-Lincke-Ufer.

In Kreuzberg the canal passes the entrance to the former Luisenstadt Canal that, between 1852 and 1926, provided a further connection to the Spree River. Although this has since been filled and partially converted to a public garden, its route can still be traced by the parallel flanking streets with their distinctive  suffixes.

After passing the elevated Möckernbrücke and Hallesches Tor stations, the U1 crosses the canal on a high level bridge that also spans the railway bridge that once gave access to the, now demolished, Anhalter Bahnhof. Shortly after that, the elevated U2 line crosses the canal.

After entering Tiergarten, the canal flows between the Großer Tiergarten Park and the Berlin Zoological Garden. Here the canal passes through the lower lock and is bridged by the Berlin Stadtbahn. This historic elevated railway carries S-Bahn, Regional-Express and InterCity trains.

Events
After Rosa Luxemburg was executed on 15 January 1919, her body was dumped into the Landwehr Canal, where it was not found until 1 June 1919. A memorial marks the site. In 1920, Anna "Anastasia" Anderson (Franziska Schanzkowska) attempted suicide by jumping into the water. In 1932, the initial construction of the Shell-Haus overlooking the canal was completed.

On 27 April 1945, the Red Army was closing in on the German Army's final defensive stronghold in the Tiergarten district of Berlin. As some Soviet troops were using the U-bahn tunnels for their advance, German military engineers, apparently acting on Hitler's direct orders, blew up retaining walls by a railway tunnel adjoining the canal, drowning many civilians and evacuated army casualties (in hospital trains) who were given refuge in the tunnels.

On 8 June 1962, a party of fourteen East German refugees commandeered the river steamer Friedrich Wolff, erected steel plates around the wheelhouse and sailed from the Spree into the Landwehr Canal. An East German patrol boat intercepted them and opened fire, but West German police returned fire and all landed safely on the canal bank, in the West.

References

Canals in Berlin
Buildings and structures in Charlottenburg-Wilmersdorf
Buildings and structures in Friedrichshain-Kreuzberg
Buildings and structures in Mitte
Federal waterways in Germany
Canals opened in 1850